Leonard Kent may refer to:

 Leonard Kent (cricketer) (1924–2014), New Zealand cricketer
 Bruce Kent (cyclist) (Leonard Bruce Kent, born 1928), New Zealand cyclist
 Len Kent (born 1930), Australian rules footballer